Carla Humphrey (born 15 December 1996) is an English footballer who plays as a midfielder for Liverpool.

Early life
Humphrey attended sixth-form at Hinchingbrooke School in Cambridgeshire.

Club career
Humphrey started playing football for her local boys' team at Brampton followed by two years with Rushden & Diamonds.  She joined the Arsenal Ladies Centre of Excellence in 2006 and progressed through the age groups.  Humphrey impressed through her time at the academy winning the FA Youth cup twice, the U17 league and the FA Development league.  During her final season in the FA WSL Development League Southern Division she was the top scorer with 22 goals in 20 games and was voted the Players’ Player of the Year

Humphrey signed her first professional contract with Arsenal in February 2015. Following a 2015 season where she saw limited playing time, Humphrey went on loan to the Doncaster Rovers Belles for the 2016 FA WSL season. She returned to Arsenal for the 2017 FA WSL Spring Series.  Following this series, Humphrey signed for Bristol City ahead of the 2017–18 season.

Humphrey signed for Liverpool in July 2021, helping the club to promotion back to the Women's Super League in her first season.

International career
At international level, Humphrey has represented England at under-15, under-16, under-17, under-19, under-20 and most recently under-23 level.

Honours
Liverpool F.C.
 FA Women's Championship: 2021-22

References

External links

 Profile at the Liverpool F.C. website
 
 
 
 

1996 births
Living people
English women's footballers
Women's association football midfielders
Women's Super League players
Doncaster Rovers Belles L.F.C. players
Sportspeople from Cambridgeshire
Arsenal W.F.C. players
Bristol City W.F.C. players
Liverpool F.C. Women players
England women's youth international footballers
Women's association football forwards